Vincent Friell (born 7 January 1960 in Glasgow, Scotland) is a Scottish actor, whose most memorable role was that of Will Bryce in the Scottish crime comedy film Restless Natives (1985).

Friell's other cinematic appearances have included roles in other Scottish films such as Trainspotting (1996) and The Angels' Share (2012).

He has also appeared in a variety of television shows including Rab C. Nesbitt, Taggart, Still Game and Being Victor.

External links

References 

20th-century Scottish male actors
1960 births
Living people
Male actors from Glasgow
21st-century Scottish male actors
Scottish male film actors
Scottish male television actors